St. George's College, Mussoorie, is an all-boys boarding and non-boarding school in Mussoorie, in the state of Uttarakhand, India, affiliated to the Council for the Indian School Certificate Examinations board. It was opened in a cottage known as Manor House; the name by which the campus is still known. The students are known as Manorites.

The school has an alumni network spread across the globe. In 2005, the Indian Air Force gifted the school a trainer jet aircraft, TS-11 Iskra, as a tribute to the distinguished service of the school's alumni in the armed forces.

History
The school was founded in 1853 by the Capuchin Fathers who gave it to the Society of the Reverend Brothers of St. Patrick (Ireland) in 1894 with Bro. Stapleton as its first principal.

While St. George's College was founded in 1853, another school, St. Fidelis High School, was started in the same location in 1863. Initially, the Capuchin Fathers ran both schools with Father James Doogan as principal of both from 1873 till they were given to the Patrician Brothers in 1894. In 1948, St. Fidelis High School was amalgamated with St. George's College. There still are old directional markings on the school campus pointing towards the old St. Fidelis. In the early 1900s, the then Principal, Bro. Haverty, levelled the top of the hill to create what is the Top Flat, the school's largest playing field.

The Science labs were constructed in 1925 adjacent to the top flat. The school acquired the Whytebank Castle and Brooklands Estate in 1939, and an auditorium was constructed in 1942.

The school is named after Saint George, the patron saint of England and a number of countries and cities around the world. The legend of Saint George slaying the dragon is known throughout the world, and forms the theme of the school's emblem.

A clock tower was erected on the field in 1936, and was the first clock tower in Mussoorie. It was installed by JB Joyce & Company, who imported the clock from England. The chimes, ringing every 15 minutes, would also help keep away the wild animals from the surrounding woods.

Under the guidance of then principal, Bro. J.C. Carroll, the school witnessed a construction boom in the 1990s. This included a new indoor gymnasium, a library, a multi-functional auditorium, and an indoor heated swimming pool. There were upgrades to old dormitories and class rooms. The alumni network of the school contributed substantial funds and donated material towards the construction.

The St. George's College museum displays the 150-year history of the school. The museum also serves as an archive for preserving hundreds of old photographs, instruments, school records, yearbooks and furniture. The collection includes photographs from the 1870s, scientific instruments from the 1900s, and an old piano.

School site
St. George's College is spread over a  estate in Barlowganj village, a hamlet situated 5 km from the hill town of Mussoorie, popularly referred to as the 'Queen of Hills'. There are two schools, one is Nirmala Convent School for economically weaker inhabitants of Mussoorie, the other St. George's College. Both schools stand on a 400-acre property. St. George's stands on a hill overlooking the Sivalik Hills with a view of Mussoorie and the Dehradun valley. The school is accessed by road from Dehradun Railway Station 28 km away, and from Jolly Grant Airport in Dehradun, 53 km away.

School life

A Manorite's week day begins at 5:30 AM. Students spend one hour from 7 AM in "morning studies." The study session is followed by breakfast. The entire school assembles in front of the classrooms for their morning assembly, where the principal addresses the students, announcements are made, awards are given out, and after prayers, classes begin at 9 :00 AM.

Classes run from 9 AM till 11 AM, where there is a short break of 20 min. Lunch is at 12:30 PM. Classes run till 3:30 PM followed by tea.

Dinner is at 6:30 PM. Dinner is followed by "night studies", which are two hours of compulsory self-study sessions in the classrooms. The night studies are followed by half an hour of television when the students can catch the latest news headlines or sports updates. Lights go out at 10 PM.

St. George's College house system encompasses sports, athletics, debates, dramatics, cultural events, declamations and other extra-curricular activities. The four houses are Tapsells (blue), Marthins (yellow), Gateleys (red) and Cullens (green), all named after four former Olympians from the school.

Each event is assigned points and the house with the largest number of accumulated points at the end of Sports Day in October wins the annual House Shield.

A majority of the students are Indians, but the school has a sizeable percentage of NRI's and students from Nepal, Thailand and others. The proximity to Jolly Grant Airport in Dehradun which is just 53 km away has led to an increase in the Non Resident Indian students.

Extracurricular activities 
After classes, there is a mandatory run for every student around the surrounding hill, called the "Fox Hill runs". The runs are followed by sports.

Every month, students get one Sunday as the "Outing" day, when they are permitted to visit Mussoorie, with each student given some pocket money for the day.

In August, St. George's hosts the Brother Masterson and Brother Bergin Inter-school English Debates in the junior and senior categories respectively.

During the spring and summer months, when the hills of Mussoorie are blooming with the yellow Mansur flower (after which the town gets its name) and wild berries, students gather berries in the evenings and on weekends.

Sports
There are inter-house and inter-class tournaments throughout the year. There are four major fields in the school, the Top Flat, Middle Flat, Green Flat and Down Flat. There is a synthetic open-air tennis court, and an indoor heated swimming pool.

Hockey and cricket are played during the summer months, and the monsoons represent the football season. Indoor sports are played throughout the year.

The Annual Sports Day attracts outside guests, alumni and parents. It includes track events among the four houses, and culminates with a march past by all classes in front of the guests. All classes compete in the banner competition. The day culminates with the awarding of individual shields and the House Shield to the house with the most accumulated points.

The school has produced sportsmen who have achieved laurels for the school at the inter-school, district, state and national level competitions. The school's senior and junior football teams have achieved success at tournaments held in Dehradun, New Delhi and other parts of the country. St. George's has produced athletes who have gone on to represent their state at the national level in football, cricket and athletics.

Sports tournaments
Jackie Memorial Football Tournament, held each year in July and August, was started in 1972 and named after a former student. It is one of the biggest open football tournaments in the district, and draws attention from the local media. The tournament is open to all schools and amateur local clubs in the district, and is played on the Top Flat, the school's largest field overlooking the clock tower. The school's sister schools in Delhi, Coonoor, Meerut have participated.

The Jarvis Cup is an annual inter-class hockey tournament that is played at junior and senior levels. The Apollo Cup is an inter-class football tournament, started in 1969 to commemorate the first landing on the moon. The tournament is again divided into the junior and senior categories. Further sports competitions include the Manorite Table Tennis Tournament, and the Brar Memorial Interschool Swimming Carnival

Inter-school sports
The school's rival in football is Wynberg Allen School, located at Kulri, Mussoorie, though the frequency of their games have gone down in recent years. In hockey and cricket, the school's rival is Oak Grove School, located down the road from Barlowganj at Jharipani, Mussoorie.

The old residential schools of Mussoorie - St. George's College, Wynberg Allen School, Oak Grove School and Woodstock School - compete with each other in the Annual Mussoorie Interschool Athletic Meet.

St. George's also hosts, and visits, residential schools from Dehradun such as the Doon School and RIMC, throughout the year for friendlies in football, hockey, basketball and cricket as well as extracurricular activities. Most of the regional residential schools are regular features in the Jackie Memorial Football Tournament. In addition, St. George's participates in the district sports meet held by the Dehradun District Sports Association. The school's proximity to Jolly Grant Airport in Dehradun has led to an increase in visitors as well as participation from other schools.

In popular culture

St. George's was chosen as the location for the shooting of television drama based on the life of the noted writer from Mussoorie, Ruskin Bond. The show, Ek Tha Rusty, named after the author's nickname, was aired on Doordarshan.

In 2012, Rocky and Mayur, hosts of Highway on My Plate, a weekly travel and food show on NDTV channel, visited the school and ate a meal at the cafeteria with the students.

The school campus is featured in two television commercials: one for Hyundai Accent sedan in which the school's library, junior dormitories and the clock tower can be seen, and the second being for Cadbury Bournvita in which the school's green flat, indoor swimming pool and the parish church can be seen. The school campus was also featured in the promotional ad for the 6th season of Kaun Banega Crorepati.

Notable alumni

Indian Armed Forces
 General Shankar Roychowdhury, PVSM (Class of 1953), Chief of Army Staff of the Indian Army (1994–1997); Member of Parliament, Rajya Sabha.
 Air Chief Marshal Denis La Fontaine, (Class of 1946) - the 13th Chief of Air Staff of the Indian Air Force (1985–1988).
 Air Chief Marshal Birender Singh Dhanoa - the 25th Chief of the Air Staff (2016-2019).
 Lieutenant General Daulet Singh - General Officer Commanding-in-Chief Western Command (1961-1963), died in harness.
 Lieutenant General Anil Kumar Bhatt - General Officer Commanding XV Corps (2018-2019).
 Air Marshal Denzil Keelor, Vir Chakra, Kirti Chakra, (Class of 1940), Indo-Pakistani War of 1965.
 Wing Commander Trevor Keelor, Vir Chakra, Vayu Sena Medal; hero of the Indo-Pakistani War of 1965.
 Major Haripal Singh Ahluwalia (Class of 1954), IOFS officer. Padma Bhushan, Padma Shree, Arjuna Award; first Indian to scale Mount Everest on 29 May 1965.Injured in 1965 war. President- Rehabilation Council of India, Organised and led motor expeditions over the Himalayas and Tibet to the Silk Route. Author of several books.

Sports
 Willie G. Cullen, Ernie .J. Cullen, Michael Gateley, George Eric Marthins, Lionel Emmett, Carlyle Carroll Tapsell - Gold medal winners for India in field hockey - 1928 Amsterdam Olympic Games, 1932 Los Angeles Olympic Games, 1936 Berlin Olympic Games

Performing arts
 Melville De Mello (Class of 1932), Padma Shri, broadcaster and author;
 Saeed Jaffrey (Class of 1940), cultural ambassador and actor; first Indian actor featuring on Broadway; performances in British and Indian film and television.
 Lucky Ali, singer and actor
 Kanwaljit Singh (Class of 1966), film and television actor
 Bhupinder Singh - Film and TV Actor
 Ravi Baswani - Actor, most remembered for his role in "Chashme Buddoor "(1981) and "Jaane Bhi Do Yaaro" (1983), winning the Filmfare Best Comedian Award in 1984
 Rohan Mehra- Film and TV Actor

Civil Services
 Dr. M.S Gill (Class of 1952), Chief Election Commissioner of India (1996–2001), Member, Rajya Sabha (2004–2005), former Union Minister of Youth Affairs and Sports, Government of India.
 Avinder Singh Brar, IPS - Awarded Padma Shri posthumously in1988 for bravery during terrorism in Punjab.

Members of Parliament
 Satpal Maharaj, Member of Parliament, 15th Lok Sabha, from Garhwal Lok Sabha Constituency.
 Neville Foley, Member of Parliament, Lok Sabha.
 Lalit Suri, Member of Parliament, Rajya Sabha.

Judges
 Justice H. S. Bedi - Justice of the Supreme Court of India.

Pakistani nationals
 Brigadier Mervyn Cardoza, Tamgha-e-Khidmat, Pakistan Army.
 Mumtaz Bhutto- Pakistani Politician.

References

External links
 
 St. George's College Facebook Page
 Manorite Alumni Association

Patrician Brothers schools
Schools in Colonial India
Private schools in Uttarakhand
Boys' schools in India
Catholic schools in India
Catholic boarding schools in India
Boarding schools in Uttarakhand
Christian schools in Uttarakhand
Education in Dehradun district
Mussoorie
Educational institutions established in 1853
1853 establishments in India